Calders Peak is a summit in West Virginia, in the United States.

The summit was named for Alexander Calder, who erected an observation tower here.

References

Mountains of Monroe County, West Virginia
Mountains of West Virginia